Legionella erythra is a Gram-negative bacterium from the genus Legionella which was isolated from cooling-tower water in Seattle.

References

External links
Type strain of Legionella erythra at BacDive -  the Bacterial Diversity Metadatabase

Legionellales
Bacteria described in 1985